Victor George Atiyeh (February 20, 1923 – July 20, 2014) was an American politician who served as the 32nd Governor of Oregon from 1979 to 1987. He was also the first elected governor of Middle Eastern descent and of Syrian descent in the United States.

Atiyeh was elected in 1978, defeating incumbent Democratic Governor Robert W. Straub. He was re-elected against future Governor Ted Kulongoski with 61.6% of the vote in 1982, the largest margin in 32 years. Prior to being elected Governor, Atiyeh had served continuously in the Oregon Legislature since 1959, initially in the House and later in the Senate. 

Early life
Atiyeh's parents, George Atiyeh and Linda Asly, immigrated to the United States from Al Husn, Syria and Beirut, Lebanon respectively. Atiyeh's father came through Ellis Island in 1898 to join his brother Aziz's carpet business. Atiyeh's mother's family belonged to the Antiochian Orthodox Church though Atiyeh would join the Episcopal Church later in life.

Atiyeh grew up in Portland, Oregon, attending Holladay Grade School and Washington High School. He spent two years at the University of Oregon in Eugene, where he played guard for the Oregon Ducks football program and became a regional leader in the Boy Scouts of America. When his father died, Atiyeh dropped out of college and took over his family's rug and carpet business, Atiyeh Brothers.

Career

Atiyeh served as a member of the Oregon House of Representatives for Washington County from 1959 to 1964 and in the Oregon State Senate for the 9th district from 1965 to 1978.

Governor of Oregon 
In 1974, Atiyeh ran for governor and lost to Democrat Robert W. Straub. After defeating former governor Tom McCall in the primary, Atiyeh ran against Straub again in the 1978 election, but won this time with 55 percent of the vote. He was the first Arab American to be elected as a U.S. governor. 

In 1982, Atiyeh won re-election to a second four-year term, winning 61.4% of the vote over Democrat Ted Kulongoski - the largest victory margin in 32 years for a gubernatorial election in Oregon. Atiyeh carried all 36 counties in the state. 

As governor, Atiyeh established new public safety programs for Oregon's traditional fishing and lumber trades. He provided incentives to bring new industries to the state to diversify the economy, including the opening of a trade office in Tokyo, Japan, Oregon's first overseas trade office. He launched a worldwide tourism initiative and worked towards the designation of the Columbia River Gorge as a national scenic preservation area. These efforts earned him the nickname "Trader Vic."

Atiyeh helped establish a statewide food bank, which was the nation's first. He also worked to raise awareness of the dangers of drunk driving and signed new laws against the practice. He chaired the Republican Governors Association and was the Republican National Convention's floor leader for President Ronald Reagan in 1984.

Volunteer and charitable work
Atiyeh had a long relationship with Forest Grove-based Pacific University, serving as a trustee and trustee emeritus and accepting an honorary doctorate from the university in 1996. He donated a trove of his memorabilia to the university library in 2011.

Later career
After leaving office, Atiyeh became an international trade consultant. 

In 2006, Atiyeh co-chaired the "Yes on 49" campaign, supporting Ballot Measure 49, along with Democratic former governor Barbara Roberts, former and future governor John Kitzhaber, and then-governor Ted Kulongoski. He solicited a $100,000 donation to the campaign from Phil Knight, CEO of Nike.

Personal life 
Atiyeh lived in Portland with his wife, Dolores (née Hewitt), whom he married on July 5, 1944. They had two children, Tom and Suzanne. Dolores Atiyeh died on August 29, 2016, in Portland at the age of 92.

Health and death
On August 31, 2005, Atiyeh underwent quadruple bypass surgery; he drove himself to St. Vincent Medical Center after suffering chest pains. Atiyeh was noted for his fiscal conservatism; his spokesman noted that he had stopped on his way to the hospital to fill his car with gas, having observed the sharply rising prices. In the weeks following the surgery, Atiyeh was readmitted to the hospital for several brief stays after suffering shortness of breath and pain in his arms.

On July 5, 2014, Atiyeh fell at his home. He was admitted again to Providence St. Vincent Medical Center, where he was treated for internal bleeding; while he was briefly released, he was re-hospitalized after incurring an adverse reaction to pain medication, and died from kidney failure on July 20, at age 91.

References

External links

 Records of Governor Victor G. Atiyeh's Administration (January 8, 1979 - January 12, 1987) from the Oregon State Archives
 Biography on Oregon Historical Society website
 Victor Atiyeh Collection of personal papers, Pacific University
 Obituary in The Oregonian

|-

|-

1923 births
2014 deaths
20th-century American Episcopalians
20th-century American businesspeople
20th-century American politicians
Accidental deaths from falls
Accidental deaths in Oregon
American politicians of Syrian descent
American people of Lebanese descent
Burials at River View Cemetery (Portland, Oregon)
Businesspeople from Portland, Oregon
Deaths from kidney failure
Governors of Oregon
Members of the Oregon House of Representatives
Oregon state senators
Portland, Oregon Republicans
Republican Party governors of Oregon
University of Oregon alumni
Washington High School (Portland, Oregon) alumni